Hong Kong Note Printing Limited is a company which prints the bank notes of all the three note-issuing banks in Hong Kong. The banknote printing plant was founded in 1984 by Thomas De La Rue in Tai Po Industrial Estate. In April 1996, the Hong Kong Government purchased the plant through the Exchange Fund, and operated it under the current name.

Shareholders
In March 1997, the government sold 15% of the company's issued share capital to the China Banknote Printing and Minting Corporation (CBPMC). In October the same year, the government sold 10% of the company's issued share capital to each of the three note-issuing banks in Hong Kong (total 30%), namely The Hongkong and Shanghai Banking Corporation Limited, the Standard Chartered Bank (now Standard Chartered Bank (Hong Kong)), and the Hong Kong Branch of the Bank of China (now Bank of China (Hong Kong) Limited).

See also
 Banknotes of the Hong Kong dollar
 Hong Kong dollar

References

External links
HKNPL website

Printing companies of China
Manufacturing companies of Hong Kong
Banknote printing companies
Currencies of Hong Kong
Companies established in 1984
1996 mergers and acquisitions